Anthony Reynard Watson,  (March 3, 1957-July 1, 2021) a native of  Mobile, Alabama, was an American soul singer, who toured and recorded (off and on) with The Chi-Lites in the late 1980s and 1990s.

Career
Watson's career began with the group Return Ticket in Europe; he later toured with the group Praze. His eponymous album was released by Amherst Records in 1985, as well as such singles as Solid Love Affair, She Will Never Wait Forever, and Missing You Tonight.

Watson met Marshall Thompson of the Chi-Lites' founder, and joined the group as lead vocalist in the late 1980s. He would leave the Chi-Lites twice during the nineties, with his predecessor Frank Reed returning in his absence. 9 Days of October was released during his first leave; after a return and re-exit, he worked on an album produced by Betty Wright that did not get released, entitled 'Ain't No End to the Rainbow'.

He would continue to tour off and on with the Chi-Lites until 2002.

He died on July 1, 2021 at the age of 64.

External links
 Soulwalking
 [ AllMusic]
 An in-depth interview with Anthony Watson at Soul Express

American soul singers
American male singers
Living people
Musicians from Mobile, Alabama
The Chi-Lites members
Year of birth missing (living people)